The 1975 Amstel Gold Race was the tenth edition of the annual road bicycle race "Amstel Gold Race", held on Sunday March 29, 1975, in the Dutch provinces of Limburg. The race stretched 238 kilometres, with the start in Heerlen and the finish in Meerssen. There were a total of 138 competitors, and 35 cyclists finished the race.

Result

External links

Results

Amstel Gold Race
1975 in road cycling
1975 in Dutch sport